Darion Duncombe (born January 16, 1990) is a male track and field athlete from Freeport, Bahamas who mainly competes in the 100m and 200 and 400m. He attended Sunland Baptist Academy and Tabernacle Baptist High on Grand Bahama before going on to compete for Rust College in Holly Springs, Mississippi. Duncombe won a gold medal in the Heptathlon at the 2009 CARIFTA Games in Vieux Fort, Saint Lucia. Duncombe also won a bronze medal in the boys 4x 400m relay at the 2006 Central American and Caribbean Junior Championships in Port of Spain, Trinidad.

Duncombe also played as a running back for the Bahamas American Football Jr team at the IFAF 2009 Junior World Championship Qualification Tournament game held in Panama City, Panama. Bahamas played the Mexico National team.

Personal bests

References

External links
World Athletics Bio
Athletic.net Bio
Duncombe kick return Panama

1990 births
Living people
Bahamian male sprinters
People from Freeport, Bahamas
Rust College alumni
Junior college men's track and field athletes in the United States